Omiodes noctescens is a moth in the family Crambidae. It was described by Frederic Moore in 1888. It is found in India, China Korea, Japan and Taiwan.

References

Moths described in 1888
noctescens